Churchs Ferry is an unincorporated community in Ramsey County, North Dakota, United States that has been impacted by the expansion of nearby Devils Lake. The population was 9 at the 2020 census. 

Churchs Ferry was a city from its founding in 1883 until September 2022 when the town unincorporated and was turned over to Ramsey County.

History

Devils Lake began rising in the early 1990s, and more than 400 homes around the lake have been relocated or destroyed. This includes much of the community of Churchs Ferry, one of two municipalities that have been bought out by government agencies. The other is Penn, although some people remain in both communities.

Devils Lake keeps getting larger as its outlet (Tolna Coulee) is significantly higher than the rest of the lake. In the 1880s, the lake was large enough that a man by the name of Irvine Church once operated a ferry in the area (hence the town's name), but by 1940, the lake had all but dried out. The lake is now growing back towards its maximum size again.

On January 10, 2012, Churchs Ferry residents voted 5 to 2 to remain an incorporated town.

On June 14, 2022, the town's 6 remaining residents voted to dissolve the city with a 5-1 vote. The city dissolved on September 1, 2022 with Paul Christenson being the last mayor of Churchs Ferry.

Geography
Churchs Ferry is located at  (48.268898, -99.196487).

Demographics

2010 census
As of the census of 2010, there were 12 people, 5 households, and 5 families residing in the city. The racial makeup of the city was 100.0% White.

There were 5 households, of which 20.0% had children under the age of 18 living with them and 100.0% were married couples living together. 0.0% of all households were made up of individuals. The average household size was 2.40 and the average family size was 2.40.

The median age in the city was 48.5 years. 8.3% of residents were under the age of 18; 8.3% were between the ages of 18 and 24; 25% were from 25 to 44; 58.4% were from 45 to 64; and 0.0% were 65 years of age or older. The gender makeup of the city was 50.0% male and 50.0% female.

2000 census
As of the census of 2000, there were 77 people, 33 households, and 26 families residing in the city. The population density was 178.2 people per square mile (69.1/km2). There were 46 housing units at an average density of 106.5 per square mile (41.3/km2). The racial makeup of the city was 100.00% White.

There were 33 households, out of which 21.2% had children under the age of 18 living with them, 63.6% were married couples living together, 9.1% had a female householder with no husband present, and 21.2% were non-families. 21.2% of all households were made up of individuals, and 12.1% had someone living alone who was 65 years of age or older. The average household size was 2.33 and the average family size was 2.50.

In the city, the population was spread out, with 19.5% under the age of 18, 3.9% from 18 to 24, 23.4% from 25 to 44, 36.4% from 45 to 64, and 16.9% who were 65 years of age or older. The median age was 48 years. For every 100 females, there were 102.6 males. For every 100 females age 18 and over, there were 106.7 males.

The median income for a household in the city was $33,438, and the median income for a family was $60,313. Males had a median income of $30,625 versus $33,750 for females. The per capita income for the city was $18,327. None of the population and none of the families were below the poverty line.

Education
It is in the Leeds School District.

References

Cities in North Dakota
Cities in Ramsey County, North Dakota
Populated places established in 1886
1886 establishments in Dakota Territory